Reductive evolution is the process by which microorganisms remove genes from their genome.  It can occur when bacteria found in a free-living state enter a restrictive state (either as endosymbionts or parasites) or are completely absorbed by another organism becoming intracellular (symbiogenesis). The bacteria will adapt to survive and thrive in the restrictive state by altering and reducing its genome to get rid of the newly redundant pathways that are provided by the host. In an endosymbiont or symbiogenesis relationship where both the guest and host benefit, the host can also undergo reductive evolution to eliminate pathways that are more efficiently provided for by the guest.

Examples 

Endosymbiont or parasitic microorganisms such as Rickettsia prowazekii, Chlorella in Paramecium, Buchnera aphidicola in aphids, and Wolbachia bacteria in Wuchereria bancrofti have all been studied and fully sequenced which is why they are used as examples of reductive evolution. Sometimes bacteria will eliminate genes from their genome, this is called reductive evolution. Reductive genes can be nonessential to the organism and makes it so the bacteria can reproduce more efficiently.

Another example of this would be the black queen hypothesis, where bacteria rely on extracellular metabolites, produced by symbiotic bacteria in their environment. The bacteria become dependent on one another by reducing, getting rid of the genes responsible for producing their own metabolites. It can also be a from obligate intracellular organisms that reduce their genomes and become dependent on the host to produce metabolites for the organism to use.

Endosymbiotic theory 

Reductive evolution is the basis behind the Endosymbiotic Theory, which states that Eukaryotes absorbed other microorganisms (Eukaryotes and archaea) for their metabolites produced. The absorbed organisms undergo reductive evolution, deleting genes that were deemed nonessential or non-beneficial to the cell in its specific niche in the host. When comparing fossil evidence reductive evolution can be demonstrated.

DNA found in ancient prokaryotic and mitochondria fossils have been found to have higher levels of cytosine and guanine compared to the DNA found in the same organism today. Different segments of the genome found to be unfavorable have possibly been removed over time due to deletions of DNA causing the genome to be reduced. The amount of cytosine and guanine in an organisms genome is a direct correlation to the overall size of that genome.  

The genome can become more complex or simplified due to random mutations.

Chlorella is a secondary endosymbiont that lives within Paramecium species and is an example of obligate intracellular reductive evolution. Moranella is a double membrane gram-negative-like bacteria that lives in another endosymbiont, "Candidatus Tremblaya", which itself lives in the mealy bug.

History

Following reductive evolution, it is suggested that between 180 and 425 million years ago the Rickettsia parasite incident occurred. It has been hypothesized that this event had to have happened later on as the Rickettsia and mitochondria evolved from a common ancestor. With this information, scientists understand that Rickettsia and mitochondria had to have happened at different points in their evolution. Fossils have been used to identify and confirm these endosymbiotic events, but not nearly enough have been found for a good statistical sample size.

Lyn Margulis remarked, "bacterium established a stable residence within the cytoplasm of a primitive eukaryote and supplied the cell with energy in exchange for a protected environment with a ready supply of nutrients." This became the leading theory of endosymbiosis. This was further proved with the finding that mitochondria and chloroplasts had a separate genome from the host genome, but had lost the ability to live outside of the host.

Identification 

There are many methods to help identify if genes have been deleted, two of which are maximum parsimony (MP) or maximum likelihood (ML) patterns are used to recreate the evolutionary tree of these species and their gene compositions of the ancient forms as well as the gene losses and gained along the tree branches which are then compared to each other. There are limitations, however, mostly due to using different models or adding new information which can skew results. Such as using Dollo Parsimony or Weighted Parsimony. 

Maximum parsimony (MP) 

Maximum likelihood (ML)

Rickettsia prowazekii is an unrestricted microorganism which has been used to demonstrate genome degradation DNA and genome size is not linked to the complexity of an organism. There are some bacteria that have a lot more DNA than a human. This is not yet understood and is referred to as the C-value Enigma or C-value Paradox. In other words, the vast amount of DNA in a haploid genome doesn't compare to the complexity of an organism and can be very different. Through the process of reductive evolution large sections of the DNA could have been removed, turned off, or phased out by the organism if found to be no longer useful in its desire to survive and grow.

References 

Evolution